Max Ritter von Müller was a German fighter ace credited with shooting down 36 enemy airplanes.

List of victories

This list is complete for entries, though obviously not for all details. Abbreviations from sources utilized were expanded by editor creating this list. Sources: Norman Franks, Frank Bailey, Russell Guest (1993). Above the Lines: The Aces and Fighter Units of the German Air Service, Naval Air Service and Flanders Marine Corps, 1914–1918. Grub Street Publishing, London. , ; Norman Franks, Hal Giblin (2003), Under the Guns of the Kaiser's Aces, Grub Street, London. .

Footnotes

References

Citations

Bibliography

 
 

Aerial victories of Müller, Max Ritter von
Müller, Max Ritter von